The Tongyeong–Daejeon Expressway is an expressway in South Korea. It connects Tongyeong to Daejeon. The expressway's route number is 35, which it shares with the Jungbu Expressway. This expressway joins the Gyeongbu Expressway at Cheongju and they divide again at Daejeon.

History 
 March 1992 - Construction begins as Daejeon–Tongyeong Expressway
 20 December 1996 - Jinju-West Jinju segment opens to traffic.
 22 October 1998 - West Jinju-Hamyang segment opens to traffic.
 6 September 1999 - Sannae-Biryong segment opens to traffic.
 22 December 2000 - Muju-Sannae segment opens to traffic.
 August 2001 - Numbered 35, which it shares with the Jungbu Expressway.
 29 November 2001 - Hamyang-Muju segment opens to traffic.
 December 2002 - Renamed to Tongyeong–Daejeon Expressway
 14 December 2005 - Tongyeong-Jinju segment opens to traffic.

List of facilities 

 IC: Interchange, JC: Junction, SA: Service Area, TG: Tollgate

 Nami (Cheongju) ~ Hanam (East Seoul) segment's name is Jungbu Expressway.

See also
Transport in South Korea

External links
 MOLIT South Korean Government Transport Department

 
Expressways in South Korea
Roads in South Gyeongsang
Roads in North Jeolla
Roads in South Chungcheong
Roads in Daejeon